The Minister for Māori Development is the minister in the New Zealand government with broad responsibility for government policy towards Māori, the first inhabitants of New Zealand. The Minister heads the Te Puni Kōkiri (TPK, or the Ministry of Māori Development). Between 1947 and 2014 the position was called Minister of Māori Affairs; before that it was known as Minister of Native Affairs. , the Minister for Māori Development is Willie Jackson.

Role
The role of the Minister for Māori Development differs from those of other ministers. While the Minister for Māori Development does have a government department to supervise (Te Puni Kōkiri, TPK for short, or the Ministry of Māori Development), he or she also has input into other portfolios to the extent that they affect Māori. For example, the Minister for Māori Development would expect to be involved in the development of Māori language policy in the education portfolio, even though education is normally the sole responsibility of the Minister of Education.

History
The office was originally called Minister of Native Affairs, or simply Native Minister. Most early Ministers of Native Affairs were not Māori, although a convention existed that there should be Māori in Cabinet (albeit without portfolio). Prior to the implementation of responsible government, Māori affairs (specifically the purchase of land from Māori by the Crown) had been handled by the Governor.

Attitudes of early Ministers were varied. The first Minister, William Richmond, considered Māori to be savages, and believed that his task was to "reform" Māori by making them more like Europeans. He was particularly hostile to Māori tradition of shared land ownership, considering it "beastly communism". Other Ministers were more friendly to Māori interests — James FitzGerald, the sixth Minister, believed that peaceful co-existence with Māori was vital, and considered the confiscation of Māori land to be an "enormous crime". Other Ministers have varied between these positions.

The first Minister of Native Affairs to be ethnically Māori was James Carroll, appointed by the Liberal Party in the late 19th century. Another prominent Minister of Native Affairs was Āpirana Ngata, also of the Liberals. For the most part, however, early Ministers were Pākehā, although were frequently advised by Māori colleagues. Maui Pomare of the Reform Party and Eruera Tirikatene of the Labour Party were examples of politicians who played a major role in the portfolio without actually holding office. After Carroll and Ngata, it was not until Matiu Rata (1972–1975) that there was another ethnically Māori Minister of Māori Affairs.

Under the Maori Purposes Act 1947, the Ministerial title and all other government usage was changed from 'Native' to 'Maori'.

1972 to present
Matiu Rata, appointed as the Minister of Māori Affairs in 1972, the first Maori since Ngata was Minister of Native Affairs in 1928.

After the 2014 general election cabinet reshuffle, the title was changed from Minister of Māori Affairs to Minister for Māori Development. While Prime Minister John Key said that there was not really any difference in what the portfolio would involve, "it gives you a sense of where the minister [Flavell] will want to shape the portfolio". During the 2014-2017 term of the Fifth National Government, Te Ururoa Flavell served as the Minister for Māori Development.

Following the formation of the Sixth Labour Government, Nanaia Mahuta was appointed as Minister for Māori Development.

List of Ministers
The table below lists ministers who have held responsibility for Māori issues. Initially, the title used was Minister of Native Affairs, but the title was changed to Minister of Maori Affairs on 17 December 1947 and then to Minister of Māori Affairs with the insertion of the macron in modern orthography under the Māori Language Commission. In 2014, the title was changed for a fourth time to Minister for Māori Development.
Key

References

Further reading

External links
Te Puni Kokiri
Minister of Māori Affairs at beehive.govt.nz
Minister for Whānau Ora at beehive.govt.nz

Maori Affairs
Race relations in New Zealand
Māori politics
New Zealand
Māori-related lists